Coinciding with the designation of several routes in the Interstate Highway System through Utah, the Utah State Legislature made several changes to the Utah State Route system. The bulk of these changes were not visible to the public, but were to unsigned legislative designations only. The primary effect was reserving route numbers 1 through 5 for the future corridors of the Interstate Highways in Utah. Several other routes were truncated or reassigned or split into multiple designations to allow the Interstate Highway corridors to have a single route number assigned. As very little of the Interstate Highway System had been constructed in Utah by 1962, these changes were primarily to support future construction. There were a number of cases where the legislative change enacted in 1962 would not be built and signed until years later. There were also changes made to a few unsigned highways serving state parks and institutions. Few of the changes made in 1962 are still valid today. As construction of the Interstate Highway system proceeded, additional changes were made. The legislature made a larger change in route designations in 1977, eliminating unsigned legislative designations and concurrences, in the process making most of the 1962 changes obsolete.

Though dozens of changes were required, most were to support the following five major changes:
State Route 1 was changed to follow the proposed route of Interstate 15 from following U.S. Route 91. While the two routes were similar, they were not identical. As a result several segments where the two routes differed were assigned new designations.
State Route 2 was assigned to the Interstate 80 corridor. Route 2 had previously been used for the legislative designation of U.S. Route 89 through Logan Canyon. A significant portion of the then future I-80 corridor was designated SR-4 prior to 1962, but the two corridors had different routes through the Salt Lake Valley. New route designations were created for the segments where the two differed.
State Route 3 was assigned to the then I-80N corridor (modern Interstate 84), it had previously been used for a highway along the western shore of Bear Lake (modern US-89 and SR-30). The eastern portion of the I-80N corridor had a single designation, SR-5, however the western portion had previously been split among multiple route numbers.
State Route 4 was assigned to the Interstate 70 corridor. SR-4 had been assigned to a Nevada to Wyoming corridor similar, but not identical, to the route of modern I-80 (designated SR-2 with this renumbering). As the I-70 corridor would require connecting multiple previous state routes and new construction, a number of highways were truncated and re-designated to free up this corridor.
State Route 5 was assigned to the proposed corridor Interstate 215. Previously SR-5 was used for the eastern portion of then U.S. Route 30S, now Interstate 84 (from Ogden through Weber Canyon to Echo).

See also
State highways deleted by the Utah State Legislature in 1969

References

External links
Utah Department of Transportation, Highway Resolutions This site has a PDF for every state route with its former and current legislative route.
Utah Highways by Dan Stober Personal website with an overview of most state routes in Utah, including pre 1962 designations.

 Renumbering
Utah State Route Renumbering, 1962
Utah State Route Renumbering, 1962
1962 renumbering
1962 establishments in Utah
1962 disestablishments in Utah
Highway renumbering in the United States